Phrai Bueng is a district (amphoe) in the central part of Sisaket province, northeastern Thailand.

Geography
Neighboring districts are (from the north clockwise): Phayu, Si Rattana, Khun Han, Khukhan, and Wang Hin.

History
The area of the district was originally part of Khukhan district. On 1 October 1969 tambons Phrai Bueng, Samrong Phlan, Din Daeng, and Prasat Yoe were split off and formed the new minor district (king amphoe) Phrai Bueng. On 22 August 1975 it was upgraded to a full district.

Administration
The district is divided into six sub-districts (tambons), which are further subdivided into 81 villages (mubans). Phrai Bueng is a township (thesaban tambon) which covers parts of tambons Phrai Bueng and Samrong Phlan. There are a further six tambon administrative organizations (TAO).

References

External links
amphoe.com

Phrai Bueng